Spring line settlements occur where a ridge of permeable rock lies over impermeable rock, resulting in a line of springs along the contact between the two layers. Spring line (or springline) settlements will sometimes form around these springs, becoming villages.

In each case to build higher up the hill would have meant difficulties with water supply; to build lower would have taken the settlement further away from useful grazing land or nearer to the floodplain.

Spring line villages are often the principal settlements in strip parishes, with long, narrow parish boundaries stretching up to the top of the ridge and down to the river but being narrow in the direction of adjacent spring line villages.

Some examples in England
 to the north and south of the Howardian Hills in the North Riding of Yorkshire.
 to the west and east of the ridge that stretches south from Lincoln and on top of which is the Roman road Ermine Street.
 to the south of London and difficult to identify among the continuous housing development of later centuries, there are: Ewell (a derivative of the Old English Et Welle), Cheam, Sutton, Carshalton, Wallington, Beddington, Waddon, Croydon, Addiscombe, Elmers End and Beckenham. Road and place names to the north of the line provide evidence that that area was relatively uninhabited: Cheam Common, Sutton Common, Thornton Heath, and Norwood (a derivative of North Wood).
 Below the northern escarpment of the South Downs are villages such as Edburton, Fulking and Poynings.
 In the Vale of the White Horse (now in Oxfordshire, formerly in Berkshire), villages such as East Ginge, West Ginge, Letcombe Bassett, Childrey and Woolstone are at the head of wooded valleys below the Ridgeway on the north-facing scarp slope.
 In East Anglia, spring line settlements such as Burwell, Cambridgeshire, Swaffham Prior and Cherry Hinton mark the fen edge and are close to the probable Lower Icknield Way.

See also
 Fall line

References

Sources

Human geography